{{Infobox college golf team
| name = Texas Longhorns men's golf
| logo = Texas Longhorns logo.svg
| logo_size = 200
| founded = 1927
| university = University of Texas at Austin
| athletic_director =Chris Del Conte
| coach = John Fields
| coach-tenure = 22nd
| mens = 
| mens-tenure = 
| womens = 
| womens-tenure = 
| conference = Big 12
| division = 
| location = Austin, Texas
| course = University of Texas Golf Club
| par = 71
| yards = 7,412
| nickname = Longhorns
| color1 = Burnt Orange
| color2 = White
| color3 = 
| hex1 = BF5700
| hex2 = FFFFFF
| hex3 = 
| NCAAchampion = 1971, 1972, 2012, 2022
| NCAArunnerUp = 1949, 1983, 1989, 1994, 2016, 2019
| Individualchampion = Ed White (1935)Ben Crenshaw (1971, 1972, 1973)Tom Kite (1972)Justin Leonard (1994)
| NCAAmatchplay =2012, 2013, 2015, 2016, 2018, 2019, 2022
| NCAAappearance = 1933, 1934, 1939, 1940, 1941, 1947, 1948, 1949, 1950, 1951, 1952, 1953, 1954, 1955, 1957, 1960, 1961, 1963, 1964, 1965, 1966, 1967, 1968, 1969, 1970, 1971, 1972, 1973, 1974, 1975, 1976, 1980, 1981, 1982, 1983, 1984, 1985, 1986, 1987, 1988, 1989, 1990, 1991, 1992, 1993, 1994, 1995, 1996, 2000, 2002, 2003, 2004, 2005, 2007, 2008, 2009, 2010, 2011, 2012, 2013, 2014, 2015, 2016, 2017, 2018, 2019, 2022
| All-American = 
| Conferencechampion = SWC1927, 1928, 1932, 1933, 1934, 1935, 1936, 1937, 1938, 1940, 1941, 1942, 1943, 1944, 1945, 1946, 1947, 1949, 1950, 1951, 1952, 1954, 1964, 1965, 1968, 1970, 1972, 1973, 1974, 1975, 1981, 1983, 1989, 1990, 1991, 1992, 1993, 1994, 1995

Big 122002, 2003, 2004, 2013, 2014, 2015, 2016, 2017
| Individualconference = SWCGib Payne (1928)Ed White (1933, 1934, 1935)Bill Welch (1936, 1937)Buck Luce (1940)Leonard Spitzer (1941)John Russell (1942)Bill Roden (1943)Frank Hoover (1944)Joe Ruby (1945)Hugh Dahlberg (1946)Ed Hopkins (1947)Bob Watson (1948, 1949)Wes Ellis (1952)Julian Oates (1953)Joe Golden (1954)Terry Dill (1960)Pat Thompson (1964)Randy Geiselman (1965)Mason Adkins (1966)Rik Massengale (1969)Dean Overturf (1970)Ben Crenshaw (1972, 1973)Lance Ten Broeck (1975)Brandel Chamblee (1983)Justin Leonard (1991, 1992, 1993, 1994)Big 12David Gossett (1999)Jason Hartwick (2004)Matt Rosenfeld (2006)Brandon Stone (2013)Scottie Scheffler (2015)Doug Ghim (2018)}}

The Texas Longhorns men's golf team has a strong golf tradition, dating back to their first season in 1927. Since then they have won national titles back-to-back in 1971 and 1972, again in 2012 and the most recent in 2022, and finished runner-up six other times (1949, 1983, 1989, 1994, 2016, 2019). Individual national champions were Ed White (1935), Ben Crenshaw (1971, 1972, and 1973), Tom Kite (1972), and Justin Leonard (1994).

Longhorns who have won the U.S. Amateur include Justin Leonard and David Gossett. Two-time U.S. Junior Amateur champion and three-time major winner Jordan Spieth played for the Longhorns golf team in 2011 and 2012. Besides Majors-winners Kite, Crenshaw, Leonard, Brooks, Spieth, and Scheffler, a number of other former Longhorn players have gone on to win on the PGA Tour, including: Phil Blackmar, Mark Brooks, Jhonattan Vegas, Bob Estes, Wes Ellis, Harrison Frazar, Cody Gribble, Rik Massengale, Scottie Scheffler, Wes Short Jr., and Brandel Chamblee. In addition, Longhorns Brandon Stone and Dylan Frittelli have each achieved multiple wins on the European Tour.

Legendary golf instructor Harvey Penick was a long-time coach at Texas. The team is currently coached by John Fields.

Yearly record
Source

Individual champions

NCAA
Texas has had 4 individuals claim the NCAA Individual Championship on 5 occasions, with a tie in 1972. 

Conference
Texas has had 31 separate golfers win a conference title on 39 separate occasions, 3 of which were a shared title. 

National honors
Source

US Amateur Champions
1992 – Justin Leonard
1999 – David Gossett

US Junior Amateur Champions
2000 – Matt Rosenfeld
2009 – Jordan Spieth
2011 – Jordan Spieth

Western Amateur Champions
1968 – Rik Massengale
1973 – Ben Crenshaw
1992 – Justin Leonard
1993 – Justin Leonard
2002 – John Klauk
2018 – Cole Hammer

Walker Cup Selections
1936 – Ed White
1971 – Tom Kite
1993 – Justin Leonard
1997 – Brad Elder
1999 – David Gossett
2011 – Jordan Spieth
2015 – Beau Hossler
2017 – Doug Ghim, Scottie Scheffler

Palmer Cup Selections
1997 – Brad Elder
2002 – John Klauk
2003 – Jason Hartwick
2004 – Jason Hartwick
2005 – Matt Rosenfeld
2015 – Beau Hossler
2016 – Doug Ghim
2017 – Doug Ghim
2018 – Cole Hammer

Fred Haskins Award
1971 – Ben Crenshaw
1972 – Ben Crenshaw
1973 – Ben Crenshaw
1987 – Bob Estes
1994 – Justin Leonard
1997 – Brad Elder
2016 – Beau Hossler

Phil Mickelson Award
2013 – Brandon Stone
2015 – Scottie Scheffler

Byron Nelson Award
2012 – Dylan Frittelli

Jack Nicklaus Award
1988 – Bob Estes
1994 – Justin Leonard
1997 – Brad Elder
2015 – Beau Hossler

Ben Hogan Award
1997 – Jeff Fahrenbruch
2018 – Doug Ghim

Arnold Palmer Award
1994 – Justin Leonard

COSIDA Academic All-American
1996 – Jeff Fahrenbruch (1st Team))
1997 – Jeff Fahrenbruch (2nd Team))
2012 – Dylan Frittelli (3rd Team)'')

See also
Texas Longhorns women's golf

References